Nikola Portner (born 19 November 1993) is a Swiss handball player for SC Magdeburg and the Swiss national team.

He represented Switzerland at the 2020 European Men's Handball Championship.

References

External links

1993 births
Living people
Swiss male handball players
Sportspeople from Lyon
Montpellier Handball players
Handball-Bundesliga players
SC Magdeburg players